Laila is the second studio album by English singer Shahin Badar, released on 5 October 2008 by Imprint Records.

Composition
The album features a blend of Arabic, English and Indian influences.

Critical response
Indi of DESIblitz said, Laila "features 18 tracks with edgy, tripping and hypnotic beats and chants." Manchester Evening News said "It is a strong offering of 18 solid cuts, which are edgy, tripping and hypnotic beats and chants." Punjab 2000 said "While this album won't set the music world alight, it should be recognised as the mark of an artist with a few tricks up her sleeve."

Track listing

References

External links

2008 albums
Bengali-language albums
Hindi-language albums
Punjabi-language albums
Urdu-language albums
Shahin Badar albums